Archibald Smith (born 19 July 1995) is a former Australian rules footballer who played for the Brisbane Lions in the Australian Football League (AFL). Formerly a talented junior basketballer, he was drafted by the Brisbane Lions with their third selection and sixty-ninth overall in the 2014 rookie draft as an Academy selection. He made his debut against  in round 19, 2016 in a near best-on-ground performance, gathering 19 disposals and 30 hit outs at the Gabba. Smith remains the only player in NEAFL history to win three premierships.

Early life
Smith is the son of former NBA and NBL basketballer Andre Moore. He played junior basketball at an elite level and was courted by multiple Division One colleges in the US before being scouted by AFL recruiters at the age of 17. Despite having no prior Australian rules football experience, Smith drew interest from recruiters due to his supreme athleticism for his size. He attended St Laurence's College in South Brisbane throughout his teenage years.

Personal life
Smith is one of 6 children, with siblings Gemma, Sebastian, Isaac, Abib and Violet. In November 2020, Archie's brother, Sebastian tragically died by suicide at the age of 21. Before every game, Archie writes his brother's name on his wrist, to remind himself who he's playing for. As an ambassador for Lifeline Australia, Archie continues to advocate for suicide prevention in his brother’s memory.

Smith announced his retirement from the AFL at the end of the 2021 season citing a desire to prioritise mental well-being and family. He married his longtime partner Sophie in October 2021, and the couple welcomed their first child, Montgomery in April 2022.

External links

References

1995 births
Living people
Australian people of African-American descent
Brisbane Lions players
Mount Gravatt Football Club players
Australian rules footballers from Queensland